Eduard Jan Bomhoff (born 30 September 1944) is a Dutch economist and retired politician who served as Deputy Prime Minister and Minister of Health, Welfare and Sport for the Pim Fortuyn List (LPF) in the Cabinet Balkenende I from 22 July 2002 until 16 October 2002. He is currently an economics professor at the Monash University Malaysia Campus in Kuala Lumpur.

Early life
Eduard Jan Bomhoff was born on 30 September 1944 in Amsterdam in an Old Catholic family as the son of Jacobus Gerardus Bomhoff a Minister and professor of literature and Riet van Rhijn. The family moved in 1957 to Leiden. Bomhoff attended the Stedelijk Gymnasium Leiden and went to Leiden University. After earning a Master of Economics there he received the Doctor of Philosophy degree in economics from the Erasmus University Rotterdam in 1979. Bomhoff worked as a lecturer in monetary policy there. He earned the rank of professor in 1981, and served as director of the Rochester-Erasmus Executive Master of Business Administration program from 1986 to 1989. He later served as a professor of finance at the Nyenrode Business Universiteit. In addition to his academic career, Bomhoff founded the NYFER institute in 1995, an economic research institute designed as an alternative to the official Bureau for Economic Policy Analysis. Bomhoff was also a columnist for the NRC Handelsblad from 1989 until 2002.

Politics

Deputy Prime Minister
Bomhoff served as Deputy Prime Minister and Minister of Health, Welfare and Sport from 22 July 2002 to his resignation on 16 October of that year. Bomhoff served as a member of the Pim Fortuyn List (LPF) despite having been a member of the Labor Party (PvdA) until that election.

Resignation
During his time in the cabinet, Bomhoff came under attack from the Minister of Economic Affairs, Herman Heinsbroek, a fellow member of the LPF. Heinsbroek stated publicly that Bomhoff was a failure as Deputy Prime Minister and started testing the waters for a new political party. A coalition partner, the VVD party, convinced the other LPF ministers that they could replace both Bomhoff and Heinsbroek. Bomhoff told his colleagues that this would not work, but they forced him and Heinsbroek to resign. As predicted by Bomhoff and several major newspapers, the coalition partners then did not allow the LPF to put forward two new ministers, but decided to immediately dissolve parliament and call for new elections. LPF never returned to the Dutch cabinet.

After politics
Bomhoff returned to academia after leaving the government, accepting positions as professor first at the University of Bahrain and later at the University of Nottingham. He is currently serving as a professor of Economics in Monash University's Sunway Campus in Malaysia, in the School of Business. Bomhoff has written a book about his time in government, titled Blinde Ambitie (Blind Ambition). He has been the Malaysian principal researcher for the World Values Survey and has published his recent research in the Journal of Cross-Cultural Psychology and in Public Choice.

Personal
Bomhoff belongs to the Old Catholic Church but considers his religion a private matter. His religious views are quite orthodox. He is married since 1976 and has two children.

References

Blinde Ambitie (in Dutch) www.eduardbomhoff.com

External links

Official
  Dr. E.J. (Eduard) Bomhoff Parlement & Politiek

1944 births
Living people
Academics of the University of Nottingham
Deputy Prime Ministers of the Netherlands
Dutch academic administrators
Dutch political writers
Dutch financial writers
Dutch columnists
Dutch Old Catholics
Dutch expatriates in Bahrain
Dutch expatriates in Kenya
Dutch expatriates in Malaysia
Erasmus University Rotterdam alumni
Academic staff of Erasmus University Rotterdam
Ministers of Health of the Netherlands
Ministers of Sport of the Netherlands
Academic staff of Monash University
Microeconomists
Academic staff of Nyenrode Business University
Politicians from Amsterdam
Pim Fortuyn List politicians
Academic staff of the University of Bahrain
20th-century Dutch economists
20th-century Dutch educators
20th-century Dutch male writers
21st-century Dutch economists
21st-century Dutch educators
21st-century Dutch male writers
21st-century Dutch politicians